Karl Max, Prince Lichnowsky (8 March 1860 – 27 February 1928) was a German diplomat who served as ambassador to Britain during the July Crisis and who was the author of a 1916 pamphlet that deplored German diplomacy in mid-1914 which, he argued, contributed heavily to the outbreak of the First World War.

Pre-1914 life and career
He was the sixth Prince and eighth Count Lichnowsky. He succeeded his father in 1901. His father was Carl, Prince Lichnowsky, fifth Prince and seventh Count Lichnowsky, a general of cavalry, and his mother was Marie, Princess of Croy. He was the head of an old noble Bohemian family, possessing estates at Kuchelna, then in Austrian Silesia, and Grätz in Austrian Moravia (present Hradec nad Moravicí, Czech Republic). As a hereditary member of the upper house of the Prussian Diet for Free Conservative Party, Lichnowsky played a part in domestic politics, adopting in general a moderate attitude and deprecating partisan legislation. Though a Roman Catholic, he avoided identifying himself with the clerical party in Germany.

Entering the diplomatic service, Lichnowsky was appointed an attaché at the London embassy in 1885 and later served as legation secretary at Bucharest. He became German Ambassador to Austria-Hungary in 1902, replacing Philipp, Prince of Eulenburg, but was forced into retirement in 1904, accused of too much independence from the Foreign Office after several conflicts with Friedrich von Holstein, head of the Office's political division. In 1904, he married Countess Mechtilde von Arco-Zinneberg (1879-1958).

He spent eight years in retirement, as his memoirs relate, "on my farm and in my garden, on horseback and in the fields, but reading industriously and publishing occasional political articles." For several years, newspaper rumour in Germany had connected the name Lichnowsky with practically every important diplomatic post that became vacant, and even with the Imperial chancellorship. No official appointment was forthcoming, however, beyond the designation of privy councilor (German: Wirklicher Geheimrat) in 1911.

In 1912, Lichnowsky was appointed ambassador to the United Kingdom, in which post he served until the outbreak of war in 1914. Soon after his appointment, he filed a report on a conversation with Lord Haldane, British secretary of state for war. In it, Haldane had made clear that Britain could go to war if Austria-Hungary attacked Serbia and Germany attacked France. The report was said to have infuriated Kaiser Wilhelm II.

The 1914 Crisis

During the July Crisis of 1914, Lichnowsky was the only German diplomat who raised objections to Germany's efforts to provoke an Austro-Serbian war, arguing that Britain would intervene in a continental war. On 25 July, he implored the German government to accept an offer of British mediation in the Austro-Serbian dispute. On 27 July, he followed with a cable arguing that Germany could not win a continental war. This cable was not shown to Kaiser Wilhelm II. A cable on 28 July relayed an offer from King George V to hold a conference of European ambassadors to avoid general war. A final cable on 29 July to the German Foreign Office stated simply "if war breaks out it will be the greatest catastrophe the world has ever seen."  These warnings went unheeded, and by the time the final cable reached Berlin, Austrian troops were already bombarding Belgrade.

On Britain's declaration of war on 4 August 1914, Lichnowsky returned to Germany. So highly was he thought of, a British military guard of honour saluted his departure – a rare privilege in the circumstances.

His 1916 pamphlet

His privately printed pamphlet, My Mission to London 1912–1914, circulated in German upper-class circles in 1916, accused his government of failing to support him in efforts to avert World War I; its 1917 publication in the United States led to his expulsion from the Prussian House of Lords. In 1918, the renamed "Lichnowsky Memorandum" was published in The Disclosures from Germany (New York: American Association for International Conciliation, 1918). It was also published in the Danish journal Politiken in March 1918, from which a British copy was published by Cassell & Co., later in 1918, with a preface by Professor Gilbert Murray.

The pamphlet mainly covers the period 1912–1914, and occasionally back to 1900. Lichnowsky deplored the German alliance with Austria-Hungary (though he owned land in Austria and had served as a diplomat in Vienna), feeling that it inevitably pulled German diplomacy into Balkan crises and tensions with Russia, without any compensating benefits to Germany with its new industries, trade and colonies. "This is a return to the days of the Holy Roman Empire and the mistakes of the Hohenstaufens and Habsburgs," he wrote.

The Kaiser had commented on 31 July 1914 about an encircling British diplomacy during the crisis: "For I no longer have any doubt that England, Russia and France have agreed among themselves, knowing that our treaty obligations compel us to support Austria-Hungary, to use the Austro-Serb conflict as a pretext for waging a war of annihilation against us. ... Our dilemma over keeping faith with the old and honourable Emperor has been exploited to create a situation which gives England the excuse she has been seeking to annihilate us with a spurious appearance of justice on the pretext that she is helping France and maintaining the well-known Balance of Power in Europe, i.e. playing off all European States for her own benefit against us."

In contrast, Lichnowsky outlined how the British foreign minister Sir Edward Grey had helped, with two treaties, on dividing the Portuguese Empire and establishing the Berlin–Baghdad railway, and had supported Germany's policy in the resolution of the Balkan Wars in 1912 and 1913 that excluded Russia. Britain had held back from declaring war until 4 August, after Belgium had been invaded, yet in a telegram sent to him from Berlin on 1 August: "... England was already mentioned as an opponent..."

Lichnowsky summed up his view on blame for the outbreak of war, and the failure of diplomacy, in three main points:

 "We [Germany] encouraged Count Berchtold [Austrian foreign minister] to attack Serbia, although German interests were not involved and the danger of a world-war must have been known to us. Whether we were aware of the wording of the [Austrian] Ultimatum is completely immaterial."
 Between 23 and 30 July, Sergey Sazonov, the Russian foreign minister, having declared that Russia would not tolerate an attack on Serbia, all attempts to mediate the crisis were rebuffed by Germany. In the meantime, Serbia had replied to the Austrian ultimatum and Berchtold was "content ... with the Serbian reply".
 "On the 30th July, when Berchtold  wanted to come to terms (with Serbia]), we sent an ultimatum to Petrograd [Russia], merely because of the Russian mobilisation, although Austria was not attacked; and on the 31st July we declared war on Russia, although the Czar pledged his word that he would not order a man to march (against Germany), as long as negotiations were proceeding – thus deliberately destroying the possibility of a peaceful settlement."

"In view of the above, undeniable, facts, it is no wonder that the whole of the civilised world outside Germany places the entire responsibility for the world war upon our shoulders."

At the pamphlet's end, he forecasts that the Central Powers were doomed to lose World War I, and says: "The world will belong to the Anglo-Saxons, Russians and Japanese." The German role, he wrote, "will be that of thought and commerce, not that of the bureaucrat and soldier. (Germany) made its appearance too late, and its last chance of making good the past, that of founding a Colonial Empire, was annihilated by the world war."

The pamphlet heavily influenced the minds of the French and British politicians who promulgated the Versailles Peace Treaty in 1919.

Comments
In his column in the 11 May 1918 issue of Illustrated London News, G. K. Chesterton would note:

And, what is worse, the spirit of this cheerless impudence has sometimes spread and chilled the blood of better men. I have noticed it lately in the last stiff pose of people who still try the stale game of blaming everybody for the war, long after the Lichnowsky revelations and the peace imposed on Russia have quite finally fixed the blame.

The latter refers to the harsh terms the Germans imposed on Russia in the Treaty of Brest-Litovsk in early March 1918. Chesterton was reminding his readers that, were Germany to win the war in the west, it would impose equally harsh terms on Belgium and France, in line with the 1914 Septemberprogramm.

Professor Murray summarised his 1918 foreword to the pamphlet with: 
The cleaner our national conscience the keener surely will be our will to victory. The slower we were to give up the traditions of generosity and trustfulness that came from our long security, the firmer will be our resolution to hold out...

Lichnowsky was seen as a 'Good German' who had truthfully warned his government but had been ignored at the crucial moment.

Lichnowsky's viewpoint was largely followed by the controversial historian Fritz Fischer in his 1961 book Germany's Aims in the First World War.

Descendants

 Wilhelm Dionysos Hermann Carl Max, 7th Prince and 9th Count Lichnowsky (Grätz, Upper and Lower Silesia, Bohemia, Cisleithania, Austria-Hungary, 1 July 1905 – Imperia, Italy, 25 March 1975), married in Cap-d'Ail, France, on 22 May 1936 to Etelka Plachota (Pressburg, Transleithania, Hungary, Austria-Hungary, 12 September 1908 – ?), daughter of Alfred Plachota and wife Maria Adelheid Widlicka, and had three children: 
 Christiane Maria, Countess Lichnowsky (Troppau, Upper and Lower Silesia, Cisleithania, Austria-Hungary, 6 February 1937 – Rio de Janeiro, Rio de Janeiro, Brazil, 19 August 1980), married.
 Felix Michael, 8th Prince and 10th Count Lichnowsky (Troppau, Upper and Lower Silesia, Cisleithania, Austria-Hungary, 17 February 1940), married in Curitiba, Paraná, Brazil, on 3 May 1962 Erica Rikaczewski (Cruz Machado, Paraná, Brazil, 3 June 1942), daughter of Franz Rikaczewski (Wittenberg, Saxony, Prussia, Germany - ?) and wife (Cruz Machado, Paraná, Brazil, 1941) Elsa Hetriech, adopted Förster (Guarapuava, Paraná, Brazil - ?), paternal granddaughter of Johannes Rikaczewski (? - Brazil, 1943), decorative painter of interiors in Wittenberg an der Elbe, emigrated with his family to Brazil after World War I and wife (Wittenberg, Saxony, Prussia, Germany) Anna Ernestine Hulrich and maternal granddaughter of Heinrich Hetriech (Upper Austria or Lower Austria, Cisleithania, Austria-Hungary - ?) and wife Dorvalina Barbosa, and had three sons: 
 Roberto, Count Lichnowsky (Curitiba, Paraná, Brazil, 3 February 1963), unmarried and without issue
 Eduardo, Count Lichnowsky (Curitiba, Paraná, Brazil, 26 September 1964), married Joyce Duarte de Duarte, and had one daughter: 
 Ursula, Countess Lichnowsky (Rio de Janeiro, Rio de Janeiro, Brazil, 1 August 1998)
 Miguel (Michael or Michel), Count Lichnowsky (Rio de Janeiro, Rio de Janeiro, Brazil, 16 November 1965), conductor, married firstly in Rio de Janeiro, Rio de Janeiro, Brazil, on 3 May 1993 and divorced in 2000 Yuiko Fujishiro (Matsue, Japan, 3 June 1966), daughter of Yo Fujishiro, elementary school teacher, and wife Ameki ..., and had one son, and married secondly in Rio de Janeiro, Rio de Janeiro, Brazil, on 10 September 2004 Chikako Hashimoto (Tokyo, Japan, 20 July 1960), without issue: 
 Rui, Count Lichnowsky (Brazil, 26 March 1996)
 Luci Margit, Countess Lichnowsky (Troppau, Upper and Lower Silesia, Cisleithania, Austria-Hungary, 11 September 1941), married in Buenos Aires, Buenos Aires, Argentina, on 10 May 1968 Theodor, Ritter von Winterhalder (Buenos Aires, Buenos Aires, Argentina, 9 April 1936 – Buenos Aires, Buenos Aires, Argentina, 12 May 2008), and had three sons: 
 Ferdinand Wilhelm, Ritter von Winterhalder (Buenos Aires, Buenos Aires, Argentina, 12 February 1969), unmarried and without issue
 Alexander Nikolaus, Ritter von Winterhalder (Buenos Aires, Buenos Aires, Argentina, 22 January 1970), unmarried and without issue
 Annabella Maria von Winterhalder (Buenos Aires, Buenos Aires, Argentina, 24 August 1971), married
 Leonore Marie Helene Leodine Mechtilde, Countess Lichnowsky (Grätz, Upper and Lower Silesia, Cisleithania, Austria-Hungary, 28 August 1906 – 2002), married
 Michael Max Leopold Nikolaus, Count Lichnowsky (Kuchelna, Upper and Lower Silesia, Cisleithania, Austria-Hungary, 9 December 1907 – ?), married in London, Middlesex, on 2 March 1932 and divorced in 1937 Mildred Withstandley (Manhattan, New York, New York County, New York, 10 November 1899 – ?), without issue, and married secondly in Rio de Janeiro, Rio de Janeiro, Brazil, on 13 November 1953 Elisabeth Umhoff (Baden-Baden, Baden, Germany, 17 June 1924), without issue

References

Notes

Citations

 "Gothaischen Taschenbücher"
 http://www.kitenews.com.br/Lichnowsky/pages/genealogy.htm

Further reading
 Lichnowsky, Karl Max, My Mission to London, 1912–1914 (New York: George H. Doran Co. [1918]) (London: Cassell & Co. 1918). 
—, Heading for the Abyss: Reminiscences (New York: Payson and Clarke, 1928).
 
 
 Edward F. Willis, Prince Lichnowsky, Ambassador of Peace: A Study of Prewar Diplomacy, 1912–14, (Literary Licensing LLC 2013)
 Harry F. Young, Prince Lichnowsky and the Great War, [1977], 2009

External links
 
 
 

1860 births
1928 deaths
Ambassadors of Germany to the United Kingdom
German people of World War I
German princes
German Roman Catholics
Karl Max
Members of the Prussian House of Lords
Free Conservative Party politicians
People from Racibórz County
People from the Province of Silesia
Grand Crosses of the Order of Franz Joseph
Commanders of the Order of the Crown (Romania)